Carson McCullers House is a historic home located at South Nyack in Rockland County, New York. It is a two-story Second Empire–style residence constructed in 1880 and modified with subsequent interior and exterior modifications largely in the Colonial Revival spirit about 1910.  It is a frame structure built originally as parsonage, three bays wide and four bays deep. It features a one-story verandah, a slate-covered mansard roof, and an interesting multi-story tower projection crowned by a bell-cast roof.  It was home to noted author Carson McCullers (1917–1967) from 1945 to 1967.

It was listed on the National Register of Historic Places in 2006.

References

Houses on the National Register of Historic Places in New York (state)
Second Empire architecture in New York (state)
Queen Anne architecture in New York (state)
Houses completed in 1880
Houses in Rockland County, New York
National Register of Historic Places in Rockland County, New York